Hirpicium is a genus of African flowering plants in the daisy family.

 Species

References

Arctotideae
Asteraceae genera
Flora of Africa